The Huari Province is one of twenty provinces of the Ancash Region in Peru. Its seat is Huari.

Geography 
The Cordillera Blanca traverses the western part of the province. Some of the highest peaks of the province are Rurichinchay and Wantsan. Other mountains are listed below:

Political division
Huari is divided into sixteen districts, which are:
 Anra 
 Cajay 
 Chavín de Huantar 
 Huacachi 
 Huacchis 
 Huachis 
 Huantar 
 Huari 
 Masin 
 Paucas 
 Ponto 
 Rahuapampa 
 Rapayan 
 San Marcos 
 San Pedro de Chana 
 Uco

Ethnic groups 
The people in the province are mainly indigenous citizens of Quechua descent. Quechua is the language which the majority of the population (78.05%) learnt to speak in childhood, 21.49% of the residents started speaking using the Spanish language (2007 Peru Census).

Archaeological sites 
The UNESCO World Heritage Site of Chavín de Huantar is the most famous archaeological site of the province. Another remarkable place with cave paintings and stone tombs (chullpa) is Markahirka.

See also 
 Allpaqucha
 Challwaqucha
 Hatun Qaqaqucha and Ichik Qaqaqucha
 Yanaqucha

References

External links
 Official web site of the Huari Province

Huari Province